"Do What You're Told" is the debut single from Swedish pop/rock and alternative rock artist Sebastian, released from his debut album "Sebastian" on 1 February 2006. The song was written by Peter Wallevik, Mikael Jakobsson and Tina Harris. It was a hit on Swedish radio and successful in the Swedish charts, staying in the #1 position for four weeks.

The song was released three months after the Idol 2005 final, where Sebastian came in second place after Agnes Carlsson.

Track list
"Do What You're Told" – 3:45
"Bring Me Some Water" – 4:09

Charts

Weekly charts

Year-end charts

References
Swedish chart entry

2006 singles
Sebastian Karlsson (singer) songs
Number-one singles in Sweden
Songs written by Peter Wallevik
2006 songs
Sony BMG singles
Songs written by Tina Harris